Kay is an  English surname. It derives from the Old Breton and Welsh cai and the Cornish key meaning "wharf", or from the Old English coeg meaning "key". The surname is also a diminutive of MacKay and McKay. Notable people with this surname include:

 Alan Kay, American computer scientist and visionary
 Alec Kay (1879–1917), Scottish footballer
 Alex J. Kay, British historian
 Andrew Kay, American computer company CEO
 Anthony Kay, American baseball player
 Antony Kay, English footballer (see also Tony Kay below)
 Barnaby Kay, English actor
 Barry Kay, Australian scenery and costume designer; photographer
 Beatrice Kay, American actress
 Ben Kay, English rugby player
 Bernard Kay, British actor
 Billie Kay (born 1989), Australian professional wrestler
 Brian Kay, British singer and conductor
 Connie Kay, American jazz drummer
 Crystal Kay, J-pop singer
 David Kay, American scientist
 Dianne Kay, American actress
 Don Kay (composer), Tasmanian composer
 Dorothy Kay (1886–1964), Irish-born South African artist
 Doug Kay, football coach
 Elizabeth Kay, British writer
 Emma Kay, British artist
 George Frederick Kay (1873–1943), American geologist
 Guy Gavriel Kay, Canadian fantasy writer
 Hadley Kay, Canadian voice actor
 Iain Kay, Zimbabwean farmer and politician
 Jackie Kay, British poet and author
 James Ellsworth De Kay, American zoologist
 James Phillips Kay-Shuttleworth, British physician and politician
 Janet Kay, British singer of Jamaican descent
 Jason Kay, British singer Jay Kay of band Jamiroquai
 John Kay (disambiguation), multiple people
 Joseph Kay (disambiguation), multiple people
 June Kay, American civil rights activist
 Karen Kay (TV personality), British entertainer and mother of Jay Kay
 Kathie Kay, Scottish singer
 Katty Kay (born 1964), British journalist
 Kay Kay, Indian playback singer
 Lesli Kay, American actress
 Leslie Ronald Kay, British executive head of Universities Central Council on Admissions 
 Lily E. Kay, historian of science 
 Lisa Kay, actress
 Lori Kay, artist
 Manuela Kay, German writer and journalist
 Margaret Kay (c. 1904–1967), Aboriginal Australian museum owner and caretaker of sacred site
 Marshall Kay, American geologist
 Mary Kay (landscape photographer), Greek photographer
 Melody Kay, American actress
 Michael Kay (announcer), American radio and television personality, play-by-play commentator for the New York Yankees
 Michael Howard Kay, British software developer
 Neal Kay, British DJ
 Norman Kay (disambiguation), multiple people
 Paul Kay, American linguist
 Phil Kay, Scottish stand-up comedian
 Peter Kay, British comedian
 Ray Kay, Norwegian film director
 Richard Kay (disambiguation), multiple people
 Robert Kay (disambiguation), multiple people
 Scott Kay, Jewelry Designer
 Sonny Kay, American record label owner
 Susan Kay, British writer
 Terry Kay, American writer
 Tom Kay (footballer, born 1883), English footballer
 Tom Kay (footballer, born 1892), English footballer
 Tony Kay, English footballer (see also Antony Kay above)
 Ughtred Kay-Shuttleworth, 1st Baron Shuttleworth
 Ulysses Kay, American composer
 Vernon Kay (born 1974), British television presenter
 Violet McNeish Kay (1914-1971), Scottish artist
 Wendell P. Kay (1913-1986), American attorney and politician
 William Kay (disambiguation), multiple people
 Willie Otey Kay, American dressmaker

See also
 Kay (disambiguation)
Kay-Shuttleworth
 Mary Kay, cosmetics brand
 Baron Shuttleworth
 Kaye (surname)

References

English-language surnames